Vestvannet is a lake located within the municipality of Sarpsborg in Østfold county, Norway. The lower part of the lake is a protected area included in the Vestvannet Nature Reserve (Vestvannet naturreservat).

See also
List of lakes in Norway

References

External links
Vestvannet (naturbase.no)
Protected areas in Ostfold

Sarpsborg
Lakes of Viken (county)